The Boston Junior Bruins are an American junior ice hockey organization playing in Marlborough, Massachusetts. They currently field three junior and a number of youth teams in the United States Premier Hockey League (USPHL).

Mission
Junior hockey is the pinnacle of the skill development program of USA Hockey. The program is available to high school students and graduates seeking a greater challenge than that available through their prep school, high school, or club team. The principal purpose of the Junior Bruins development program is to prepare the athlete for career advancement; either a collegiate program or professional opportunity.

History
The Boston Junior Bruins were founded in 1991 as an independent junior team. The Junior Bruins played prep schools and local junior teams, and competed in major tournaments throughout North America before joining the Tier III Junior A Eastern Junior Hockey League (EJHL) in 1999.

During their first three EJHL seasons, Head Coach Peter Masters and his staff led the team to fourth, third, and second-place finishes overall in the twelve-team league. In 2000–01 the team finished the regular season with a 45-15-1 overall record as the EJHL Northern Division Champions.

To better develop talent for their Junior A program, the Junior Bruins fielded a number of youth hockey teams as well as two Tier III Junior B teams in the Empire Junior Hockey League (EmJHL) and Continental Hockey Association (renamed to Eastern States Hockey League in 2011) (CHA/ESHL).

During the 2012–13 season, Junior Bruins and other EJHL teams announced the formation of a new league called the United States Premier Hockey League (USPHL). The new league would go on to absorb the former EmJHL and the recently announced Eastern Elite Hockey League (a new league consisting mostly of the former EJHL South) to create several junior and youth divisions within the USPHL. The former Junior A team would play in the USPHL Premier Division and its former Junior B team would play in the USPHL Empire Division (later named USP3). The Junior Bruins would also field a team in the USPHL Elite Division.

In 2017, the leagues underwent another realignment and the USPHL added the National Collegiate Development Conference (NCDC) as their top division. The NCDC was intended to become a Tier II league but was denied sanctioning by USA Hockey. The USPHL went forward without sanctioning for its junior leagues in the 2017–18 season and all of the Bruins' team were promoted the NCDC, Premier and Elite Divisions from the Premier, Elite and USP3 Divisions respectively.

Team members and regular season

The Junior Bruins hold tryouts in April and final camp in late July. The Junior Bruins team is typically composed of 12 to 13 forwards, 6 to 7 defensemen, and 2 goalies on the active roster.  All players are between the ages of 16 and 20. The season starts the day after Labor Day and playoffs finish during the third week of March each year. The team typically practices 3 to 4 times per week.

The schedule includes 45 EJHL regular season schedule games plus three rounds of playoffs. From year to year the Junior Bruins normally play one or both of the US National teams (USA Hockey's National Team Development Program) in an exhibition game along with some scrimmages versus local prep schools and participate in 4-6 major recruiting showcase/tournaments.

Charitable involvement
The Bay State Hockey Foundation (BSHF) is the non-profit arm of the Junior Bruins Organization. Founded in 2005, the mission of the BSHF is to provide " ... children and young adults with lower extremity paralysis and other disabilities the opportunity to participate in the sport of sled ice hockey ... " Equipment and participation are free for qualified individuals.

Season-by-season records

USA Hockey Tier III Jr National Championships
Round robin play in pool with top 4 teams advancing to semi-final.

Coach
Head coach Peter Masters functions as both head coach for the EJHL team and manager for all Junior Bruins activities. His responsibilities include program and organization development, direction of skill sessions and summer camps for youth hockey players and the Annual Junior Bruins Shootout Tournament in the fall and Beantown Classic Tournament in August.

Peter Masters, 2001 EJHL Coach of the Year, graduated from Boston College in 1997. While at Boston College, Masters played defense for the BC Eagles under coaches Steve Cedorchuk and Jerry York, and was recognized in 1997 as one of eight defensemen nationwide picked as Hobey Baker Award pre-season 'players to watch'.

Alumni
Since 1992 the Junior Bruins have placed over 100 players in college hockey and since 2001 more than 35 have been recruited to Division I college teams.

Notable former Junior level Bruins players include:
Brendan Buckley (AHL)
Bobby Butler (NHL)
Jack Eichel (NHL)
Conor Garland (NHL)
Steve Moses (NHL)
Frank Vatrano (NHL)

Notable Youth level Bruins:
Sean Haggerty (NHL)
Blake Sloan (NHL)
Rudi Ying (KHL)

Notes and references

External links
 Boston Junior Bruins Website
 USPHL Website

Ice hockey teams in Massachusetts
Sports in Marlborough, Massachusetts
1991 establishments in Massachusetts
Ice hockey clubs established in 1991